Advances in Geometry is a peer-reviewed mathematics journal published quarterly by Walter de Gruyter.
Founded in 2001, the journal publishes articles on geometry.
The journal is indexed by Mathematical Reviews and Zentralblatt MATH.
Its 2016 MCQ was 0.45, and its 2016 impact factor was 0.552.

External links

Mathematics journals
Publications established in 2001
English-language journals
De Gruyter academic journals
Quarterly journals